Chala Mussaddi ... Office Office is a 2011 Indian satirical film based on the television series Office Office, also directed by Rajiv Mehra. Starring Pankaj Kapur, Deven Bhojani, Asawari Joshi, Sanjay Mishra and others, who also featured in the TV sitcom.

Plot
Retired schoolmaster Mussaddi Lal Tripathi (Pankaj Kapur), the quintessential "Common Man" troubled by his wife's serious illness takes her to the hospital where the utter negligence and vested interests of the doctors result in her untimely death. Mussaddi then along with his young unemployed, drifter son, Bunty (Gaurav Kapoor) he sets out for his pilgrimage to the four Holy sites for the immersion of his wife's ashes. In his absence, pension officers arrive at Mussaddi's house to enquire his status. Musaddi's neighbour Gupta tells them that Mussaddi has gone far away, and the Pension Officers interpret that Mussaddi Lal has expired, and report him dead in their files. When Mussaddi returns he discovers to his utter shock that he is dead according to Government Files. He tries his heart out to make the Pension Office staff believe that he is alive, but they are not convinced at all as they want proper proof.

Mussaddi Lal, bemused and dejected by the irony of the situation, sets out on his mission to gather proof that he is alive while the Pension Office employees resolve that whatever proof Mussaddi brings they will not allow him to be officially alive since they have already mopped up his pension money. Mussaddi decides to revolt in his own way and decides to take the law in his hands. Does Mussaddi finally get his justice or does he remain a dead victim of the bureaucracy? Can Mussaddi overcome the corrupt system and its officials and be triumphant, and alive, if so- how?

Cast
 Pankaj Kapur as Mussaddi Lal Tripathi
 Deven Bhojani as Patel
 Manoj Pahwa as Bhatia
 Sanjay Mishra as Shukla
 Hemant Pandey as Pandey Ji
 Asawari Joshi as Ushaji
 Gaurav Kapoor as Bunty Tripathi, Mussaddi's son
 Farida Jalal (in a Cameo) as Shanti Tripathi, Mussaddi's wife
 Makrand Deshpande - Uncredited 
 Mahesh Thakur as Subhash the Judge

Box office 

References

External links
 

2011 films
Indian comedy films
2010s Hindi-language films
Indian satirical films
Films based on television series
2011 comedy films
2010s satirical films
Hindi-language comedy films